Senegal competed at the 1980 Summer Olympics in Moscow, USSR.

Results by event

Athletics 
Men's 100 metres
 Momar N'Dao
 Heat — 10.73 (→ did not advance)

 Boubacar Diallo
 Heat — 10.75 (→ did not advance)

Men's 200 metres
 Cheikh Touradé Diouf
 Heat — 21.98 (→ did not advance)

Men's 110 m Hurdles
 Abdoulaye Sarr
 Heat — 14.57 (→ did not advance)

Men's High Jump
 Moussa Sagna Fall
 Qualification — 2.10 m (→ did not advance)

Men's Long Jump
 Doudou N'Diaye
 Qualification — 7.66 m (→ did not advance)

Men's Triple Jump
 Abdoulaye Diallo
 Qualification — 15.68 m (→ did not advance)

Women's 100 metres
 Françoise Damado
 Heat — 12.16 (→ did not advance)

 Marième Boyé
 Heat — 12.42 (→ did not advance)

Basketball

Men's Team Competition 
 Preliminary Round (Group B)
 Lost to Yugoslavia (67-104)
 Lost to Spain (65-94)
 Lost to Poland (64-84)
 Second Round (Group B)
 Lost to Sweden (64-70)
 Defeated India (81-59)
 Lost to Australia (64-95)
 Lost to Czechoslovakia (72-88) → 11th place
 Team Roster
 Moussa Mbengue
 Bassirou Badji
 Mamadou Diop
 Yamar Samb
 Mathieu Faye
 Madiagne Ndiaye
 Mouhamadou Moustapha Diop 
 Oumar Dia
 Bireyma Sadi Diagne
 Hadramé Ndiaye
 Yaya Cissokho
 Modou Tall

Judo 
 Karim Badiane
 Akilong Diaboné
 Niokhor Diongué
 Abdoulaye Koté
 Djibril Sambou
 Boubacar Sow
 Alassane Thioub

Wrestling 
 Amadou Katy Diop
 Amboise Sarr
 Mamadou Sakho

References 
 Official Olympic Reports

Nations at the 1980 Summer Olympics
1980 Summer Olympics
Oly